Ambhora is a village situated in the Kuhi taluka of Nagpur district in the Indian state of Maharashtra. As of the 2011 Indian census, it had a population of 530.

References

Villages in Nagpur district
Gram Panchayats in Maharashtra